The Wooden Church is a Greek-Catholic church in Camăr, Romania, built in 1780.

References

Bibliography
 Cristache-Panait, Ioana (22 August 1978). „Biserica Sf. Arhangheli Mihail și Gavril din Camăr”. Monumente istorice bisericești din Eparhia Ortodoxă Română a Oradei. Biserici de lemn: 279–283, Oradea.
 Studii regionale Cristache-Panait, Ioana (22 August 1971). „Bisericile de lemn din Sălaj”. Buletinul Monumentelor Istorice 1971 (1): 31–40.
 Ghergariu, Leontin (22 August 1973). „Meșterii construcțiilor monumentale de lemn din Sălaj”. AMET 1971-73: 255–273, Cluj.
 Ghergariu, Leontin (22 August 1976). „Biserici de lemn din Sălaj”. mss în Arhivele Naționale din Zalău, colecția personală Leontin Ghergariu (actul 11 din 1976).
 Godea, Ioan (22 August 1996). Biserici de lemn din România (nord-vestul Transilvaniei). București: Editura Meridiane.

External links
 Biserica Sfinţii Arhangheli din Camăr

Historic monuments in Sălaj County
Greek-Catholic churches in Romania
Wooden churches in Sălaj County
Churches completed in 1780